Cole Michael Bennett (born May 14, 1996) is an American music video director and videographer. His multimedia company, Lyrical Lemonade, started in 2013 as an internet blog while he was in high school.

Early life 
Cole Bennett was born on May 14, 1996, in Plano, Illinois. He went to Plano High School and he dropped out of DePaul University to focus on his career in videography and hip hop music, something he wanted to do since childhood.

Lyrical Lemonade 
Bennett originally founded Lyrical Lemonade as an internet blog when he was a high school student in Plano, Illinois. His mother helped him come up with the blog's name and had given him a video camera. He began directing music videos for local Chicago rappers, such as Vic Mensa, Taylor Bennett (no relation), King Louie, and Ridgio, all of which he uploaded onto the Lyrical Lemonade channel. His channel also featured live show recaps, cyphers, documentaries and interviews.

The channel then expanded into other sub-genres of hip hop beyond the local Chicago scene, such as the emerging Soundcloud rap sub-genre. In 2016 and early 2017, he gained early recognition, working with artists such as Famous Dex, Lil Pump, Smokepurpp and Ski Mask the Slump God. On April 7, 2017, he released his first short film, "Lone Springs". In August 2017, he directed the music video for the Lil Xan single, "Betrayed", which was certified Platinum by the RIAA in 2018. He later directed numerous music videos for hit songs, which include Ski Mask the Slump God's "BabyWipe", Lil Skies' "Red Roses" and "Nowadays" and YBN Nahmir's "Bounce Out with That".

In May 2018, he directed the music video for Chicago rapper Juice Wrld's "Lucid Dreams", which peaked at number 2 on the Billboard Hot 100. The video has surpassed 840 million views on YouTube, becoming his most popular video on the channel. He has since worked with mainstream figures in hip hop such as J. Cole, Wiz Khalifa, Kanye West, and Eminem.

In March 2020, he directed the music video for Eminem's hit single "Godzilla". The video itself features cameos from Dr. Dre and Mike Tyson. It gained 13 million views in 24 hours. In December 2020, in his second collaboration with Eminem, Bennett directed the music video for the rapper's single "Gnat".

Impact 

Bennett's Lyrical Lemonade frequently promotes and contributes to the rise of upcoming rappers. Examples of this include Lil Pump, whose appearance on Lyrical Lemonade elevated his popularity to a certain extent. Other examples include Pump's friend and frequent collaborator Smokepurpp, Juice Wrld, Ski Mask the Slump God, YNW Melly, Lil Tecca, NLE Choppa, Lil Mosey, and Jack Harlow.

Pitchfork named Ski Mask the Slump God's 2017 "Catch Me Outside" music video, which was directed by Bennett, one of their favorite music videos of the 2010s.

Other Ventures 
Bennett has also ventured into creating merchandise and lemonade beverages under the Lyrical Lemonade name. He said, "I really want to compete with Minute Maid and all of the elite lemonade and juice companies and I really think we can do that."

In February 2020, Lyrical Lemonade collaborated with Jordan Brand. The collection included an Aerospace 720 shoe, a hooded sweatshirt, and a long sleeve t-shirt. In April 2020, Lyrical Lemonade collaborated with streetwear brand FTP. The collection included a hooded sweatshirt, a t-shirt, and co-branded cans of lemonade.

In November of 2021 Cole Bennett launched another virtual retail space called "by cole bennett." Here, individuals are able to buy clothing and other soft goods that are designed by Bennett himself and are subject to limited releases. On the same virtual store front, Bennett occasionally allows fans to purchase props previously used in Lyrical Lemonade videos.   

Bennett hosts a music festival called Summer Smash every year. It is presented by independent Chicago-based event production label SPKRBX.

Accolades

Videography

References 

American music video directors
1996 births
Living people
People from Plano, Illinois